"Old Coyote Town" is a song recorded by American country music artist Don Williams.  It was released in January 1989 as the fourth single from the album Traces.  The song reached number 5 on the Billboard Hot Country Singles & Tracks chart. The song previously appeared on co-writer Larry Boone's 1988 album Swingin' Doors, Sawdust Floors, and was the B-side to that album's single "Wine Me Up".  Boone wrote the song with Paul Nelson and Gene Nelson.

Chart performance

Year-end charts

References

1989 singles
1988 songs
Larry Boone songs
Don Williams songs
Songs written by Larry Boone
Songs written by Gene Nelson (songwriter)
Songs written by Paul Nelson (songwriter)
Song recordings produced by Garth Fundis
Capitol Records Nashville singles